"Paper Bag" is a song by American singer-songwriter Fiona Apple, released as the third single from her second studio album, When the Pawn... (1999). The song earned Apple a Grammy Award nomination for Best Female Rock Vocal Performance for the 43rd Grammy Awards (2001).

Background and composition
Apple wrote "Paper Bag" following an experience in which she mistook a plastic bag for a dove. The event took place in Los Angeles following recording sessions for her previous studio album, Tidal (1996); Apple, reportedly upset at the time, was a passenger in a car being driven by her father. Apple's lyrics are what she calls "extensions of her journal", many of which draw experiences from a rape and subsequent mental health problems, including disordered eating, obsessive–compulsive disorder, and complex post-traumatic stress disorder. The lyrics in "Paper Bag" are about minimizing different types of pain, something that is reflective of the feminine experience, and resonated with girls and women in online conversations associated heavily with trauma and eating disorders, particularly anorexia nervosa, a different disorder than Apple's own. "Hunger hurts, but starving works" became a common, relatable moniker in disordered eating communities.

Allmusic's Matthew Greenwald described "Paper Bag" as having a "loose, almost ragtime" melody and rhythm pattern, with an "up and down" chord pattern creating a "funky, looping feel". The Record noted the "infectious" song includes "Beatlesesque horns". The Boston Globe classified it as a "piano ditty" that "owes equally to Kurt Weill and Paul McCartney," while The Buffalo News noted that it "provides a more contemporary hip hop sound" than other songs on her album.

Reception
Matthew Greenwald of Allmusic wrote that "Paper Bag" was one of the more accessible, "inspiring" tracks from the album. Greenwald appreciated Don Sweeney's horn arrangement, which he called "joyous". In 2012, Bob Gendron of the Chicago Tribune opined, "A midst a backdrop of gently brushed drums, 'Paper Bag' highlighted an ugly tempestuousness at odds with its breezy cabaret melody." In the "Rolling Stone Special Nineties Edition," the song was ranked as the 29th. Rolling Stone Magazine ranked it as the 382nd greatest song of all time in 2021.

The song is considered a "fan favorite". It earned Apple a Grammy Award nomination for Best Female Rock Vocal Performance for the 43rd Grammy Awards (2001).

Music video
Paul Thomas Anderson directed the music video for "Paper Bag", which features a blue-and-red palette. Anderson and Apple were in a romantic relationship at the time.

Usage in media
"Paper Bag" was featured in the 2006 film The Last Kiss and the 2011 film Bridesmaids.

References

2000 singles
2000 songs
Fiona Apple songs
Song recordings produced by Jon Brion
Songs about eating disorders
Songs written by Fiona Apple